Jules Christ Eboue Kouassi (born 13 December 1997) is an Ivorian professional footballer for Belgian club Genk as a midfielder.

Club career

Early career
Kouassi played for Académie Symbiose Foot d'Abobo in the Ivory Coast before moving to Armenian club Shirak in early 2014. In the summer of 2014 he joined the youth system of Russian club Krasnodar.

Krasnodar
In December 2015, Kouassi signed a new contract with Krasnodar. Kouassi made his debut for Krasnodar on 21 May 2016, in a 1–0 victory against Amkar Perm in the Russian Premier League. He became a regular the following season, 2016–17, playing in a total of 18 matches by the end of December 2016 and helping his side to fifth place in the league. During this time, Kouassi also scored his first goal; opening the scoring in a 3–0 win over Maltese side Birkirkara in a UEFA Europa League tie on 4 August 2016.

Celtic
On 3 January 2017, it was reported that Scottish Premiership club Celtic had agreed a transfer fee of around £3 million with Krasnodar to sign Eboue Kouassi. Celtic announced the signing of Kouassi on a four-year-contract, subject to obtaining a visa, on 12 January 2017.

Kouassi made 22 first-team appearances for Celtic in his first three years with the club. He was loaned to Belgian club Genk in January 2020.

Genk
Kouassi signed for Genk on 1 July 2020, for €1.5 million.

Arouca
On 31 August 2021, Kouassi was loaned to Arouca.

International career
Kouassi was called up to the Ivory Coast national team for the first time in November 2016, for a 2018 World Cup qualification match against Morocco and a friendly against France. However, he was an unused substitute in both matches.

Career statistics

Honours
Celtic
Scottish Premiership: 2016–17, 2017–18, 2018–19
Scottish Cup: 2016–17, 2017–18
Scottish League Cup: 2017–18, 2018–19

References

External links
 
 
 

1997 births
Footballers from Abidjan
Living people
Ivorian footballers
Footballers at the 2020 Summer Olympics
Olympic footballers of Ivory Coast
FC Krasnodar players
Russian Premier League players
Celtic F.C. players
Association football midfielders
Belgian Pro League players
K.R.C. Genk players
Primeira Liga players
F.C. Arouca players
Ivorian expatriate footballers
Ivorian expatriate sportspeople in Russia
Expatriate footballers in Russia
Ivorian expatriate sportspeople in Scotland
Expatriate footballers in Scotland
Ivorian expatriate sportspeople in Armenia
Expatriate footballers in Armenia
Ivorian expatriate sportspeople in Belgium
Expatriate footballers in Belgium
Ivorian expatriate sportspeople in Portugal
Expatriate footballers in Portugal